United Women's Soccer (UWS, also commonly abbreviated UWS) is a second-division pro-am women's soccer league in the United States. The league was founded in 2015 as a response to the dual problems of disorganization in the WPSL and of the folding of the original USL W-League.  The league began play in May 2016 with eleven teams in two conferences. The first league currently has 45 teams in 6 conferences and second league currently has 49 teams in 6 conferences.

History

Background 
In the summer of 2015, disorganization and the inability to field teams led to many last-minute changes in the WPSL playoffs.  This, combined with a general lack of competitiveness due to rapid expansion, led to frustration from many long-time WPSL teams.  The 2014 WPSL final four hosts ASA Chesapeake Charge elected to skip the 2015 WPSL playoffs altogether as did the entire Sunshine division, Fire & Ice SC was a no-show, and the New England Mutiny published a threatening response to how WPSL as a league was run and was regressing.

Later that year, the USL W-League suddenly announced that it would be ceasing operations.  There had been no outward signs that the league or its teams were struggling, but the league had been contracting steadily over the preceding several years - from 30 teams in four divisions for 2012 to just 18 teams in three divisions for 2015 - and many of the teams that had left were recent finalists (Buffalo Flash, Vancouver Whitecaps Women, Pali Blues, Ottawa Fury Women, and several Washington D.C.-area teams) leaving relatively few flagship teams.

Founding 
Spearheaded by the New England Mutiny (a former member of the short-lived WPSL Elite), UWS's first five teams were leaked on December 15 ahead of the league's official announcement the next day; UWS hopes to provide a true second division beneath the NWSL.   Negotiations to create the league since the beginning of the WPSL/W-League offseason, with plans that the league will be a national league of two conferences.  The eight founding teams, all in the northeastern US and eastern Canada, were the Mutiny, fellow WPSL breakaway Lancaster Inferno FC, the W-League teams Laval Comets, Long Island Rough Riders, New York Magic, North Jersey Valkyries, and Quebec Dynamo ARSQ looking for a new league, and the expansion team New Jersey Copa FC.

UWS will be sanctioned through USASA, as the W-League and WPSL were.

Rapid early growth 
Between founding and the beginning of the inaugural season, hints of the desired second Western conference came to light in late January and was made official on February 5, with the first five revealed teams being Real Salt Lake Women and Houston Aces (both previously of WPSL), and the Santa Clarita Blue Heat, the Colorado Storm, and the Colorado Pride (all previously of the W-League).

On March 9, 2016, it was announced that the Canadian Soccer Association would not sanction teams in Laval & Quebec for play in UWS, leaving the league with only 11 teams for its inaugural season.

On November 1, 2016, Grand Rapids FC announced they would add a women's team, which would begin play in 2017 in a new Midwest division of United Women's Soccer.  Three more Midwest teams (FC Indiana, Fort Wayne United Soccer Club, and the Detroit Sun FC) were announced a month later, with the desire to add more mentioned.  Further expansion ahead of the 2017 season included the Michigan Legends FC in Brighton, Indy Premier SC in Noblesville, the Syracuse Development Academy, the So Cal Crush FC in Montrose, and the Calgary Foothills WFC. On March 3, 2017, the Western New York Flash announced that they would establish a team for the 2017 season. This announcement came nearly two months after the organization, who had won the 2016 NWSL Championship, sold its NWSL franchise rights and roster which formed the North Carolina Courage. In April, the rebranded Rochester Lancers team joined the Flash in Western New York with a UWS side, the Rochester Lady Lancers. They effectively replaced the Flash, which moved team operations to their original home of Buffalo, in Rochester.

Western contraction period 

While UWS would see continued stability in the East and Midwest conferences, attempts to establish teams in the west would prove less successful. From 2017 to 2018, UWS grew from having just five teams west of the Mississippi River to having eleven, with the return of the Colorado Pride, joining of LA Galaxy OC academy, and four new teams in Texas, causing the West conference to split into a West and a Southwest conference. However, despite each conference adding a team for the 2019 season, each conference also lost two teams - including UWS founding member Real Salt Lake Women who rebranded as the Utah Royals Reserves in a return to WPSL - bringing the total number of teams west of the Mississippi to nine. Ahead of the 2020 season, four more UWS teams - Houston Aces, Colorado Pride, LAG OC, and the El Paso Surf - also left for WPSL, bringing the total back down to five.

Further expansion and creation of League Two 
In the 2020 off-season, UWS continued to add more clubs to the league and expanding their reach, including the creation of the Southeast Conference.

On February 6, 2020, UWS announced the creation of UWS League Two, a 2nd division focused on the U20-U23 age group. League Two will consist of a mix of UWS reserve teams and clubs that will be seeking to join UWS in the future. It will feature a promotion and relegation relationship with UWS starting in 2021, though the nature of how clubs will move up and down is still under discussion. The Midwest conference was the first announced for the new league, with the first four teams of said conference consisting of three independent sides as well as the reserves of Detroit Sun FC.

League One

League Two

Former members

UWS National Championship

See also
 Women's sports
 Women's professional sports
 Women's United Soccer Association

References

External links
 

 
Sports leagues established in 2015
2015 establishments in the United States
1
Professional sports leagues in the United States
Multi-national professional sports leagues